The fifth Iranian Assembly of Experts election were held in Iran on 26 February 2016 to elect the members of the Assembly of Experts. All 88 members of the Assembly of Experts, who are known as mujtahids, are directly elected. The elections had been planned for 2014, but were delayed in order for the election to be held alongside the Islamic Consultative Assembly elections.

The winning candidates of the elections, sitting until 2024, may have to choose the next Supreme Leader of Iran, or at least plan for it. The current Supreme Leader, Ali Khamenei (born ), is reported from time to time to be in poor health. Incumbents were reelected in 49 of the assembly's 88 seats.

Registration and qualification process

For the first time in the history of the Islamic Republic of Iran, 801 aspirants registered to run in the elections. The number was a 62.47% increase compared to the previous election held in 2006. Among the candidates there were 16 women, another unprecedented event. There have been no female members in the assembly since its establishment.

On December 31, 2015 the Guardian Council announced that the four-hour Ijtihad test would be held January 5, 2016 in Qom in order to indicate candidates with proper knowledge, specifying that no alternative test date would be offered. The Council invited 527 candidates to take the test, excluding the 152 who reportedly withdrew and 111 who were denied permission (for a total of 790). Of the 16 women who registered, 10 received invitations.

Nearly 80% of candidates who applied for the Assembly were disqualified by the Guardian Council, including every woman and Hassan Khomeini.

Four incumbent members were disqualified:
Ali Mohammad Dastgheib Shirazi, Fars Province
Mohammad Vaez Mousavi, East Azerbaijan Province
Mojtaba Taheri Khorramabadi, Luristan Province 
Hassan Namazi, West Azerbaijan Province
Other famous disqualified candidates include:
 Mehdi Ghoreishi
 Rasoul Montajabnia
 Kazem Seddiqi
 Morteza Agha-Tehrani
 Majid Ansari
 Mostafa Pourmohammadi

Disqualifications left nine constituencies with only one candidate per seat; in other terms 20% of seats would be won in an uncontested election (i.e. numbers of candidates is as same as numbers of seats). Later the Ministry of the Interior declared that with the Guardian Council's approval, some qualified candidates changed their electoral district to make the election competitive in the destination constituency.

Statistics

Campaigns and voting

Background

In the previous election, The Two Societies endorsed 81 candidates in a joint statement and were able to win 69 seats out of 86. The reformists did not reach a coalition and lost the election.

Along with the Parliamentary elections, it was the first election since the implementation of a landmark nuclear agreement between 5+1 and Iran that saw it curb sensitive nuclear activities in return for the lifting of sanctions against Iran. The deal was opposed by many hardliners but backed by moderates and reformists. Over 30 million Iranians voted in the elections, according to BBC.

According to dw, several polling stations were left open until midnight, in order to enable millions of voters that came late to take part in the elections.

Campaigning

In this election, contrary to the previous ones, The Two Societies did not reach a coalition and issued different lists. The main dispute between the two, was whether they should support Akbar Hashemi Rafsanjani candidacy or not. Combatant Clergy Association supported Rafsanjani; the Society of Seminary Teachers of Qom did not. There were three major electoral lists in the election:
Combatant Clergy Association, led by Ali Movahedi-Kermani
Society of Seminary Teachers of Qom, led by Mohammad Yazdi
People's Experts, led by Akbar Hashemi Rafsanjani and endorsed by The List of Hope

In a 17 February public speech, Supreme Leader of Iran Ali Khamenei warns of the subtle influence of foreign agents on the elections, stating that they are implementing new ploys in various ways to falsely polarize the election. He also condemned BBC Persian's programs on the elections and said that people will act differently from what they want.

Hardliners attacked Rafsanjani's list by calling it “The British list”, implying that it is supported by the United Kingdom.

Ahmad Khatami, the interim Friday prayer imam of Tehran spoke out in the Friday prayer: “British and foreign media outlets are asking our people not to vote for Jannati, Yazdi, Mesbah, Alamolhoda and I. This is none of your business; you nosy people should know that these five are the top choices of our people”.

Akbar Hashemi Rafsanjani dismissed the charges and said "Such interpretations regarding British list (of candidates) is an insult to Iranian peoples's wisdom", in a meeting with the reformist and moderate candidates. He also deplored that 500 knowledgeable theologians and seminarians as well as university instructors were disqualified for the elections. “They [the hard-liners] presently have no excuse to rage against us and insult us. Thus, they [the hard-liners] attribute phrases like ‘inside man’ and ‘British’ to the old revolutionaries... These figures have been defeated by the people and are now seeking to exact [their] revenge on the administration and President Rouhani”, he added.

Despite the restrictions, reformists became well-organised to seek gains. The reformists who were barred from public presence as a result of 2009 protests, tried to keep the flame alive online. The instant messaging service Telegram played an important role in the campaigning period. More than 20 million Iranians are reported to be on the messaging app. Mohammad Khatami, who is facing restrictions on activities and Iranian media (including State Television and Radio) are banned from mentioning his name or publishing the images him, released a video message online urging people to vote for “The List of Hope”, creating a huge momentum —The coalition of reformists and moderates, endorsed Rafsanjani's “People's Experts”. Khatami's message was viewed more than 3 million times on Telegram in one day. Another poster shared on the app was viewed by a million people in 12 hours.

Two days before the election, President Hassan Rouhani took to text message almost every cell phone to drum up support in Friday's elections, tacitly endorsing the moderate list of hope.

Results

Summary

According to the Associated Press, moderate clerics defeated hardliners and dominated the assembly with Akbar Hashemi Rafsanjani and Hassan Rouhani, alongside 50 of their allies, securing 59% of the seats. The moderates previously held around 20 seats in the assembly.

In Tehran Province, Rafsanjani's People's Experts list received a landslide victory, winning 15 of 16 seats, and were successful in establishing its "tactical/disapproval voting strategy", causing Mohammad-Taqi Mesbah-Yazdi and Mohammad Yazdi to lose their seats. Considering the latter was Chairman of the Assembly of Experts, the voters also changed the officeholder. However, Ahmad Jannati placed 16th and got reelected.

Compared to the previous term, 38% of the assembly has changed. Among the outgoing members, nine were deceased (among them Ali Meshkini and Mohammad Reza Mahdavi Kani), 13 did not compete in the election (four incumbents were disqualified, like Ali Mohammad Dastgheib Shirazi and 9 did not seek reelection, most notably Abbas Vaez Tabasi) and 10 were not elected.

According to a report published by the Iranian Students' News Agency, 27 seats went to Principlists while Reformists won 20 seats. 35 candidates were endorsed by both. Independent clerics who were not listed managed to win 6 seats. 

A statistical work on electoral lists by Khabaronline shows that The Two Societies have gained plurality. 27 seats were endorsed by all People's Experts, List of Hope, Combatant Clergy Association and Society of Seminary Teachers of Qom lists. Combatant Clergy Association and Society of Seminary Teachers of Qom won five and three exclusive seats respectively, while their joint lists won 24 seats. People's Experts won 19 exclusive seats.

Another piece published by Khabaronline, indicates that Combatant Clergy Association leads the race winning 66 seats and Society of Seminary Teachers of Qom and People's Experts have won 64 and 55 seats respectively. People's Experts has 16 exclusive winning candidates, the number is 3 for Society of Seminary Teachers of Qom while Combatant Clergy Association has no exclusive seat. The Two Societies have 25 shared seats and 35 candidates are endorsed by all three lists. At last, only four members of the assembly would be independent.

Turnout
Turnout was officially declared 62%. The official results were disputed by BBC Persian columnist.

Reactions/Analysis
 Supreme Leader of Iran Ali Khamenei said that “the people really shone brightly in the elections and participation of 62% of the qualified people in the election is a high percentage compared to many countries even the U.S.” The Leader said the next Assembly of Experts is duty bound to “remain revolutionary, think revolutionary and act revolutionary”. He also praised the “decent behavior” of the candidates who failed to win the votes and noted a failure by Mohammad-Taqi Mesbah-Yazdi and Mohammad Yazdi to win seats in the Assembly of Experts was a “damage” to the Assembly.
Farzan Sabet of the Carnegie Endowment saw "four important trends":
the continuing unity of the moderate alliance, 
disunity in the conservative alliance between the hardliners and the traditionalists,
voter engagement with the electoral process, and 
the use of alternative media to overcome the state’s media monopoly during campaigns. 
There were anomalies in the reported results from the Interior Ministry of Iran, an example being some candidates receiving more than 120% of the votes cast in their district, and  22 million ballots cast in four provinces with a total population of 15 million.

Aftermath

Electing new chairman
On 24 May 2016, the Assembly held its new session to elect the chairman. Akbar Hashemi Rafsanjani did not put his name and allegedly asked Ebrahim Amini to step forward for the office. The results of the voting were as follows:

The appointment of Ahmad Jannati signaled that despite recent gains by moderates, hard-liners remain the dominant force within the assembly.

By-election

Notes

See also
2016 Iranian legislative election
List of members in the Fifth Term of the Council of Experts

References

External links

2016 elections in Iran
2016
February 2016 events in Iran
Assembly of Experts elections
Uncontested elections
Iran